The 2020 Emilia-Romagna regional election took place in Emilia-Romagna, Italy, on 26 January 2020. The result was the victory of the centre-left coalition and the confirmation of Stefano Bonaccini as President of Emilia-Romagna, with more than 51% of votes, nearly doubling the number of votes received in 2014.

The election was held concurrently with a regional election in Calabria.

Electoral system
In Emilia-Romagna, a new electoral law was approved by the Legislative Assembly in July 2014, abolishing the blocked list. 

The voter can express one or two preference votes for the candidates on the chosen list; in the case of the expression of two preferences, these must concern candidates of different sex according to "gender preference" (under penalty of annulment of the second preference). As regards the election of the councilors, the law guarantees in any case at least 27 seats on the lists that support the elected president (majority prize), obtaining effects that are very similar to those of the list but acting on the provincial lists. The first 40 seats are distributed on a proportional basis. A seat is then attributed to the candidate for president who came second. The remaining 9 seats are assigned by majority method to the lists that support the elected president if these lists have obtained less than 25 seats with the previous procedure, otherwise the "prize" will be only 4 seats. If, at the end of these assignments, the majority lists have not obtained at least 27 seats, these will be guaranteed by removing some of the seats already assigned to the opposition lists.

Background
Despite Emilia-Romagna having always been considered one of the "red regions" – a stronghold of left-wing parties since the end of the World War II – in the 2018 general election the centre-right coalition became the largest political force in the region. The 2020 regional election has been considered as the first competitive one in the history of the region.

The centre-left nominated incumbent governor Stefano Bonaccini at the head of a coalition including the Democratic Party (PD) and its left-wing allies of Free and Equal (LeU) and Green Europe (EV), as well as More Europe (+E). Bonaccini also launched a personal civic list, named "Bonaccini for President", which included, among others, members from Matteo Renzi's Italia Viva (IV), Carlo Calenda's Action and Federico Pizzarotti's Italia in Comune (IiC). The centre-right proposed Senator Lucia Borgonzoni, member of the League (Lega) and former undersecretary to cultural activities in Giuseppe Conte's first government. The centre-right coalition included also Brothers of Italy (FdI), Forza Italia (FI) and Cambiamo! (C!).

Campaign

The official election campaign was opened on 14 November by the League, which organized a rally at the PalaDozza, the sport arena of Bologna. On that occasion Matteo Salvini presented the centre-right candidate Lucia Borgonzoni. At the same time, a flash mob named "6000 Sardines against Salvini" was organized in Piazza Maggiore, to peacefully protest against Salvini's campaign in Emilia-Romagna. On the following day, Nicola Zingaretti's Democratic Party held a three-day convention in Bologna, known as Tutta un'altra storia ("A whole different story"). 

On 19 November, Bonaccini and Borgonzoni had their first television debate, hosted by the talk show #Cartabianca by Bianca Berlinguer on Rai 3. The debate was followed by about 1.6 million viewers (6% share).

After a period of uncertainty regarding its participation in the regional elections, and after a decline in opinion polls and poor election results in 2019 Umbrian election, on 21 November the Five Star Movement launched a survey on its on-line platform "Rousseau", to ask its members if they should participate in the following regional elections. Almost 70% of members voted to run in the elections, and therefore M5S leader Luigi Di Maio announced the presentation of M5S electoral lists and a M5S candidate for the regional presidency, without party alliances.

On 7 December, more than 10,000 people gathered Piazza Maggiore in Bologna for the launch of Bonaccini's electoral campaign.

Electoral programmes
 Stefano Bonaccini, being the outgoing regional president, claimed the results achieved by his administration (including the "Pact for Labour" of 2015), and proposed four priority points summed up into the slogan "A step forward": to create free kindergartens for all children in the region, to break down the waiting lists for health interventions and access times to first aid, to carry out preventive maintenance and safety of the regional territory, and to reduce the phenomenon of NEET.
 The League of Lucia Borgonzoni proposed the introduction of some practices already existing in the other regions governed by the centre-right (in particular Lombardy and Veneto), including the opening of hospitals during public holidays and at night to carry out medical exams and laboratory tests, and the reduction of the regional IRPEF with introduction of 1.23% flat rate.
 The Five Star Movement of Simone Benini focused its programme on social, infrastructural and environmental issues, including the repeal of the regional legislation on urban planning, the rethinking of the Cispadana regional motorway project in favour of a fast road without toll, the reduction of waste to shut down incinerators and landfills, and generally introducing new environmental sustainability policies in the region.
 Stefano Lugli (The Other Emilia-Romagna) proposed a "safe" region in the sense of "fair, public and sustainable", i.e. based on social equality, the fight against the privatization of services and the relaunch of environmental policies.
 Marta Collot (Power to the People) presented a "rupture programme" based on equality, in particular proposing a guaranteed minimum wage of 9 euros per hour, redesigning the regional urban planning policies, and withdrawing the request for differentiated regional autonomy already presented by Emilia-Romagna in 2019.
 The Communist Party put poverty, social justice and equality at the centre of its programme.
 The 3V Movement "Vaccines We Want Truth" called for the lift of mandatory vaccinations recently enforced by the government for the access of children and infants to public schools and kindergartens.

Endorsements

Newspapers and magazines 

Stefano Bonaccini:

 Il Fatto Quotidiano
 La Notizia
 HuffPost Italia

Lucia Borgonzoni:

 Il Giornale
 Libero
 La Verità
 L'Occidentale (party newspaper of Identity and Action)
La Croce (party newspaper of The People of Family)

Parties and candidates

Opinion polls

Candidates

Parties

Results

Results by province and capital city

Turnout

Map

Elected councillors

See also
2020 Italian regional elections
Sardines movement

References

2020 elections in Italy
2020 regional election
2020
January 2020 events in Italy